The were-jaguar was both an Olmec motif and a supernatural entity, perhaps a deity.

The were-jaguar motif is characterized by almond-shaped eyes, a downturned open mouth, and a cleft head. It appears widely in the Olmec archaeological record, and in many cases, under the principle of pars pro toto, the were-jaguar motif represents the were-jaguar supernatural. The were-jaguar supernatural incorporates the were-jaguar motif as well as other features, although various academics define the were-jaguar supernatural differently. The were-jaguar supernatural was once considered to be the primary deity of the Olmec culture but is now thought to be only one of many.

Originally, many scholars believed that the were-jaguar was tied to a myth concerning a copulation between a jaguar and a woman. Although this hypothesis is still recognized as viable by many researchers, other explanations for the were-jaguar motif have since been put forward, several questioning whether the motif actually represents a jaguar at all.

The term is derived from Old English were, meaning "man", and jaguar, a large member of the cat family in the Olmec heartland, on analogy with werewolf.

Description

Were-jaguar motif 
The basic were-jaguar motif combines a cleft head, slanting almond-shaped eyes with round irises, and a downturned open mouth with a flared upper lip and toothless gums.   This motif was first described in print by Marshall Saville in 1929 and expanded upon by artist and archaeologist Miguel Covarrubias in his 1946 and 1957 books.  In this latter book, Indian Art of Mexico & Central America, Covarrubias included a family tree showing the "jaguar mask" as ancestral to all (later) Mesoamerican rain gods.

At about this time, in 1955, Matthew Stirling set forward what has since become known as the Stirling Hypothesis, proposing that the were-jaguar was the outcome of a mating between a jaguar and a woman.

In response to this groundwork, the were-jaguar became the reigning linchpin of Olmec iconography.  Nearly any representation showing a downturned mouth or cleft head was described as a "were-jaguar".  A major 1965 Olmec-oriented exhibition was entitled "The Jaguar's Children" and referred to the were-jaguar as "the divine power of the Olmec civilization".

This paradigm was undermined, however, by the discovery that same year of Las Limas Monument 1, a greenstone sculpture that displayed not only a were-jaguar baby, but four other supernaturals, each of whom had a cleft head.  Based on analyses of this sculpture, in 1976, Peter David Joralemon proposed definitions for eight Olmec supernaturals, each characterised by specific iconographic combinations.

Were-jaguar as a rain deity 
Through this and subsequent research, it became apparent that not every cleft head nor every downturned mouth represented a were-jaguar.  Some researchers have therefore refined the were-jaguar supernatural, specifically equating it with the Olmec rain deity, a proposition that artist, archaeologist, and ethnographer Miguel Covarrubias had made as early as 1946 in Mexico South.

The Olmec rain supernatural (or deity) not only displays the characteristic almond-shaped eyes, cleft head, and downturned mouth—that is, the were-jaguar motif—but has several other defining attributes, including a headband and a headdress, the latter usually cleft.  The headband is often divided horizontally and decorated with regularly spaced ornaments.  In addition to, or often as an extension of, the headdress, the supernatural also sports earbars (often pleated) running down the sides of its face, and a "crossed-bars" icon on the chest and/or navel.

Beyond the term "were-jaguar" 
Some academics have even attempted to move away from the term "were-jaguar".  For example, in his 1996 monograph, rather than "were-jaguar", Anatole Pohorilenko uses the term "composite anthropomorph", and in their 1993 book, Miller and Taube state that:

Depictions 
Although they are "strangely absent" from ceramics, three-dimensional representations of the Olmec were-jaguar supernatural appear in a wide variety of stonework, from small greenstone figurines (see this 9 cm figurine) to basalt statues (such as San Lorenzo Monument 52) to larger monuments (see lead photo).

Inert were-jaguar babies are often shown held by stoic adults, as if the infant were being presented.  This scene is depicted in a wide range of materials, from small portable carvings (see photo below) to nearly life-size greenstone statuettes, to multi-tonne altars (see photo of Altar 5 front here), although it is not known with any clarity what this act represents.

Two-dimensional representations of the were-jaguar were incised onto greenstone celts, painted on pottery, and even carved onto four multi-tonne monoliths at Teopantecuanitlan (see drawing).  Lively were-jaguar babies are depicted in bas-relief on the sides of La Venta Altar 5 (see photo below).

According to archaeologist Peter Furst, were-jaguar figurines were likely used as household gods for many people and as spirit helpers or familiars for priests or shamans, aiding in transformative acts and other rituals.

Origins 

As the major predator of Mesoamerica, the jaguar was revered by pre-Columbian societies, and adoption of jaguar motifs by the ruling elite was used to reinforce or validate leadership.  However, this does not explain the were-jaguar motif in and of itself, and the possible origins of the motif have engaged scholars for over a half century.

The Stirling hypothesis 
Matthew Stirling, who made many of the initial Olmec discoveries in the mid-20th century, proposed that the were-jaguar motif was derived from the story of copulation between a male jaguar and a female human, largely based on:

Potrero Nuevo Monument 3,
Tenochititlán Monument 1,
Laguna de los Cerros Monument 20, and
Murals from Chalcatzingo.

This so-called Stirling hypothesis won guarded support from later archaeologists, including Michael D. Coe.  Further analysis of these sculptures by scholars including Whitney Davis, Carolyn Tate, Carson Murdy, and Peter Furst, however, have cast doubt on this hypothesis, instead proposing alternatives to explain the jaguar characteristics.

Jaguar as victor 
In his 1978 article, Whitney Davis suggests that the so-called depictions of human-jaguar copulation on monuments are instead the beginnings of a jaguar cult or are representative of conquest in battle rather than a sexual conquest. Rather than viewing the people and jaguar-figures in sexual situations, Davis sees the jaguar, or man in jaguar pelts, as an aggressor towards a defeated opponent. Most of the figures in the reliefs and monuments are clothed in loincloths, which would negate copulation, and Davis believes those that are naked appear dead or dying rather than in a sexual posture. It is not uncommon to see unclothed human figures as representative of dead captives or opponents in battle, as in the danzantes of Monte Albán.

Genetic defects 
Even before Davis questioned the idea of a belief system centering on human-jaguar copulation, scholars such as Michael Coe looked for biological causes for the fleshy lips, cleft head, and toothless mouths that make up the were-jaguar motif. Genetic abnormalities like Down syndrome and spina bifida have been common explanations. People afflicted with spina bifida in particular present developmental defects that coincide with the were-jaguar characteristics. One such condition is encephaloceles, which among other things, can cause separation of the cranial sutures and result in a depression, or cleft, in the head. Cranium bifidum can produce similar results. In addition, there is a higher chance of these conditions occurring within the same family than randomly throughout the population, and there might have been considerable inbreeding among the elite.  If children born with this affliction were seen as divine or special in some way, multiple births of affected children within a family or familial line would have reinforced that family's political and religious power.

Were-jaguar as toad 

Peter Furst, among others, has suggested that the were-jaguar actually represents a variety of native toad, specifically "an anthropomorphically conceived toad with jaguar characteristics".

Species of toad that are commonly found in Mesoamerica, like Bufo marinus or Bufo valliceps, have the pronounced cleft in the head and, like all toads, have a fleshy mouth with toothless gums. These species of toad are known to have ceremonial and hallucinogenic properties for many cultures of Mesoamerica. Skeletal remains of these species, particularly Bufo marinus, have been found at several archaeological sites in Mesoamerica including Olmec ceremonial centers. These species of toads have inherent symbolic power in their metamorphic life cycle, their fertility, their hallucinogenic venom, and especially their skin-shedding.

Those were-jaguar representations that have fangs commonly attributed as jaguar fangs can also be explained as toad-like. Several times a year, mature toads shed their skin. As the old skin is shed, the toad will eat it. As the skin is eaten, it hangs out of the toad's mouth and closely resembles the fangs of the were-jaguar. The process of regeneration could have symbolised death and rebirth, with all its attendant religious implications.

Were-jaguar as harpy eagle 
The were-jaguar can also be represented as a harpy eagle. Peter Furst argues that the were-jaguar's equivalent in the sky is the harpy eagle. Both are powerful creatures associated with ancient Olmec shamanic transformation. Furst makes this conclusion based upon iconographic evidence and the fact that harpy eagles are also apex predators.

Summary 
There are many theories and associations that swirl around the were-jaguar motif, and they need not be not mutually exclusive. It is possible that were-jaguars meant different things at different times during the Olmec period or to the many different people who created the images. The matter is far from settled.

See also 
Naguals, later Mesoamerican mythical shape-shifters
North American jaguar
Skin-walker
Therianthropy
Were
Werecat
Werehyena
Wererat
Werewolf

Notes

References 
, eds. (1996) Olmec Art of Ancient Mexico, National Gallery of Art, Washington D.C., .
 (1998) "The Lord, The Ruler: Jaguar Symbolism in the Americas". In N.J. Saunders (ed.), Icons of Power: Feline Symbolism in the Americas. London: Routledge: 53-76.
 (1972) "Olmec Jaguars and Olmec Kings". In E.P. Benson (ed.), The Cult of the Feline. Washington, D.C.: Dumbarton Oaks: 1-12.
 (1999) The Maya. London: Thames and Hudson: 90, 247-48.
 (2002) Mexico: From the Olmecs to the Aztecs. London: Thames and Hudson: 64, 75-76.

 (1957) Indian Art of Mexico and Central America. New York: Alfred A. Knopf.
 (1978) "So-Called Jaguar-Human Copulation Scenes in Olmec Art". American Antiquity 43(3): 453-457.

 (1981) "Jaguar Baby or Toad Mother: A New Look at an Old Problem in Olmec Iconography". In E.P. Besnon (ed.), The Olmec and Their Neighbors. Washington D.C.: Dumbarton Oaks: 149-162. .
 (1996) "In Search of the Olmec Cosmos: Reconstructing the World View of Mexico's First Civilization". In E. P. Benson and B. de la Fuente (eds.), Olmec Art of Ancient Mexico. Washington, D.C.: National Gallery of Art: 51-60. .

 (1981) "Congenital Deformities and the Olmec Were-Jaguar Motif". American Antiquity 46(4): 861-871.
 (1996) "Portable Carvings in the Olmec Style", in E. P. Benson and B. de la Fuente (eds.), Olmec Art of Ancient Mexico. Washington, D.C.: National Gallery of Art: 119-131. .
 (2007) Olmec Archaeology and Early Mesoamerica. Cambridge University Press. .
 (1999) "Patrons of Shamanic Power: La Venta's Supernatural Entities in Light of Mixe Beliefs". Ancient Mesoamerica 10: 169-188.
 (1998) "Architecture of Symbolism: The Feline Image". In N.J. Saunders (ed), Icons of Power: Feline Symbolism in the Americas. London: Routledge: 12-52.

Further reading 
Joralemon, Peter David (1971) A Study in Olmec Iconography. In Studies in Pre-Columbian Art and Archaeology, No. 7. Washington, D.C.: Dumbarton Oaks.

Olmec mythology and religion
Olmec art
Mythological felines
Mythic humanoids
Legendary mammals
Indigenous Mesoamerican legendary creatures
Therianthropes